Otto Plettner (born 26 September 1940) is a Mexican rower. He competed at the 1964 Summer Olympics and the 1968 Summer Olympics.

References

1940 births
Living people
Mexican male rowers
Olympic rowers of Mexico
Rowers at the 1964 Summer Olympics
Rowers at the 1968 Summer Olympics
Place of birth missing (living people)
Pan American Games medalists in rowing
Pan American Games bronze medalists for Mexico
Rowers at the 1967 Pan American Games
20th-century Mexican people
21st-century Mexican people